This is a list of 175 species in Scaphytopius, a genus of leafhoppers in the family Cicadellidae.

Scaphytopius species

 Scaphytopius abbreviatus DeLong 1916 c g
 Scaphytopius abutus DeLong 1980 c g
 Scaphytopius acuminatus DeLong 1943 c g
 Scaphytopius acutus (Say, 1830) c g b  (sharp-nosed leafhopper)
 Scaphytopius aequinoctialis Van Duzee 1933 c g
 Scaphytopius aequus DeLong 1943 c g
 Scaphytopius alas DeLong 1943 c g
 Scaphytopius albascutellus Caldwell 1952 c g
 Scaphytopius albifrons Hepner 1946 c g
 Scaphytopius albocephalus DeLong 1943 c g
 Scaphytopius albocinctus DeLong 1943 c g
 Scaphytopius albolutescens Zanol 2000 c g
 Scaphytopius albomarginatus DeLong 1943 c g
 Scaphytopius altus DeLong 1944 c g
 Scaphytopius amazonicus Zanol 2000 c g
 Scaphytopius amplinotus Hepner 1946 c g
 Scaphytopius anadamus DeLong 1943 c g
 Scaphytopius analis Van Duzee 1923 c g
 Scaphytopius andromus Ball 1931 c g
 Scaphytopius angustatus (Osborn, 1905) c g b
 Scaphytopius anisacanus Ball 1931 c g
 Scaphytopius anticus Stål 1862 c g
 Scaphytopius apertus DeLong 1943 c g
 Scaphytopius appendiculatus Zanol 2000 c g
 Scaphytopius arcuatus DeLong 1944 c g
 Scaphytopius argutus (DeLong, 1945) c g b
 Scaphytopius atrafrons DeLong 1943 c g
 Scaphytopius atrifrons DeLong & Linnavuori 1978 c g
 Scaphytopius barroensis Linnavuori & DeLong 1978 c g
 Scaphytopius bifidellus DeLong & Linnavuori 1978 c g
 Scaphytopius biflavus Cwikla & Freytag 1982 c g
 Scaphytopius bolivianus Oman 1938 c g
 Scaphytopius brevis Van Duzee 1907 c g
 Scaphytopius brunneus Hepner 1946 c g
 Scaphytopius caldwelli DeLong 1943 c g
 Scaphytopius californiensis Hepner 1946 c g
 Scaphytopius calliandrus Ball 1931 c g
 Scaphytopius campester DeLong 1943 c g
 Scaphytopius canus Hepner 1946 c g
 Scaphytopius carasensis Linnavuori & Heller 1961 c g
 Scaphytopius carenatus Zanol 2000 c g
 Scaphytopius celtidis Ball 1931 c g
 Scaphytopius chiquitanus Linnavuori & DeLong 1978 c g
 Scaphytopius cinctus DeLong 1943 c g
 Scaphytopius cinereus Osborn & Ball 1897 c g
 Scaphytopius cinnamoneus (Osborn, 1915) b
 Scaphytopius collaris Sanders & DeLong 1919 c g
 Scaphytopius contractus Hepner 1946 c g
 Scaphytopius cornutus DeLong 1944 c g
 Scaphytopius cruzianus Metcalf 1967 c g
 Scaphytopius cumbresus Linnavuori & DeLong 1978 c g
 Scaphytopius curtus DeLong 1944 c g
 Scaphytopius delongi McKamey & Hicks 2007 c g
 Scaphytopius deltensis Hepner 1946 c g
 Scaphytopius desertanus Ball, 1931 c g b
 Scaphytopius diabolus Van Duzee 1925 c g
 Scaphytopius dilatus DeLong 1944 c g
 Scaphytopius divisus DeLong 1944 c g
 Scaphytopius dodonanus Ball 1931 c g
 Scaphytopius dorsalis Ball 1909 c g
 Scaphytopius dubius Van Duzee 1910 c g
 Scaphytopius duocolorus DeLong 1943 c g
 Scaphytopius eburneus Zanol 2000 c g
 Scaphytopius elegans  b
 Scaphytopius elongatus DeLong 1944 c g
 Scaphytopius expansus Linnavuori & Heller 1961 c g
 Scaphytopius falcatus DeLong 1943 c g
 Scaphytopius fasciatus DeLong 1944 c g
 Scaphytopius ferruginosus Zanol 2000 c g
 Scaphytopius flavens DeLong 1943 c g
 Scaphytopius flavifrons Hepner 1946 c g
 Scaphytopius fluxus DeLong 1943 c g
 Scaphytopius frontalis Van Duzee, 1890 c g b  (yellowfaced leafhopper)
 Scaphytopius fuliginosus Osborn 1923 c g
 Scaphytopius fulvostriatus Linnavuori 1959 c g
 Scaphytopius fulvus (Osborn, 1905) c g b
 Scaphytopius furcifer Linnavuori 1959 c g
 Scaphytopius fuscicephalus Hepner 1946 c g
 Scaphytopius fuscifrons Van Duzee 1894 c g
 Scaphytopius goodi DeLong 1943 c g
 Scaphytopius graneticus Ball 1931 c g
 Scaphytopius guterranus Ball 1931 c g
 Scaphytopius hambletoni DeLong 1944 c g
 Scaphytopius hebatus DeLong 1943 c g
 Scaphytopius heldoranus Ball 1931 c g
 Scaphytopius hilaris Linnavuori 1959 c g
 Scaphytopius hymenocleae Van Duzee 1923 c g
 Scaphytopius iadmon Linnavuori 1973 c g
 Scaphytopius insolitus Hepner 1946 c g
 Scaphytopius irroratus Van Duzee 1910 c g
 Scaphytopius irrorellus DeLong 1944 c g
 Scaphytopius isabellinus Zanol 2000 c g
 Scaphytopius jandacephalus Caldwell 1952 c g
 Scaphytopius jocosus Van Duzee 1923 c g
 Scaphytopius labellus DeLong 1980 c g
 Scaphytopius latens DeLong 1943 c g
 Scaphytopius latidens DeLong 1944 c g
 Scaphytopius latus (Baker, 1900) c g b
 Scaphytopius limbatus Osborn 1926 c g
 Scaphytopius limbramentus DeLong 1943 c g
 Scaphytopius lineacephalus Caldwell 1952 c g
 Scaphytopius lineafrons DeLong 1943 c g
 Scaphytopius lineus DeLong & Linnavuori 1978 c g
 Scaphytopius linnavuorii McKamey&Hicks2007 c g
 Scaphytopius loricatus (Van Duzee, 1894) i c g
 Scaphytopius lumenotus DeLong 1943 c g
 Scaphytopius luteus DeLong 1944 c g
 Scaphytopius maculosus DeLong 1944 c g
 Scaphytopius magdalensis Provancher, 1889 c g b  (blueberry leafhopper)
 Scaphytopius majestus  b
 Scaphytopius marginelineatus Stål 1859 c g
 Scaphytopius marginellus DeLong 1944 c g
 Scaphytopius marginifrons DeLong 1943 c g
 Scaphytopius meridianus Hepner 1946 c g
 Scaphytopius modicus Hepner 1946 c g
 Scaphytopius monticolus DeLong 1944 c g
 Scaphytopius nanus Van Duzee 1907 c g
 Scaphytopius nasutus Van Duzee 1907 c g
 Scaphytopius neloricatus Caldwell 1952 c g
 Scaphytopius nigricollis Ball, 1916 c g b
 Scaphytopius nigrifrons DeLong, 1923 c g b
 Scaphytopius nigrinotus Caldwell 1952 c g
 Scaphytopius nigriviridis Ball 1909 c g
 Scaphytopius nitridus DeLong 1943 c g
 Scaphytopius obajuba Zanol 2000 c g
 Scaphytopius obatubira Zanol 2000 c g
 Scaphytopius oinomaos Linnavuori 1973 c g
 Scaphytopius oregonensis (Baker, 1900) c g b
 Scaphytopius osborni Van Duzee 1910 c g
 Scaphytopius pallescens Linnavuori & DeLong 1979 c g
 Scaphytopius pallidicapitatus Hepner 1946 c g
 Scaphytopius pallidiscutus Hepner 1946 c g
 Scaphytopius pallidus DeLong 1944 c g
 Scaphytopius paraguayensis Cheng 1980 c g
 Scaphytopius parallelus DeLong 1943 c g
 Scaphytopius paulistanus Zanol 2000 c g
 Scaphytopius pennatus Hepner 1946 c g
 Scaphytopius peruigua Zanol 2000 c g
 Scaphytopius picturata Osborn 1924 c g
 Scaphytopius piperatus DeLong 1943 c g
 Scaphytopius plummeri DeLong 1943 c g
 Scaphytopius quinquenotus DeLong 1943 c g
 Scaphytopius radiatus Hepner 1946 c g
 Scaphytopius retusus Van Duzee 1937 c g
 Scaphytopius rotundiceps Linnavuori 1959 c g
 Scaphytopius rubellus Sanders & DeLong, 1919 c g b
 Scaphytopius rubidus DeLong 1980 c g
 Scaphytopius rubranotus DeLong 1944 c g
 Scaphytopius saginatus Linnavuori 1959 c g
 Scaphytopius schuezi Linnavuori & Heller 1961 c g
 Scaphytopius scriptus Ball 1909 c g
 Scaphytopius scutellatus Van Duzee 1923 c g
 Scaphytopius serratus DeLong 1943 c g
 Scaphytopius serrellus DeLong 1944 c g
 Scaphytopius slossoni Van Duzee 1910 c g
 Scaphytopius spadix DeLong 1943 c g
 Scaphytopius speciosus Van Duzee 1923 c g
 Scaphytopius spinosus DeLong & Linnavuori 1978 c g
 Scaphytopius stonei DeLong 1943 c g
 Scaphytopius subniger DeLong 1943 c g
 Scaphytopius sulphureus Osborn 1923 c g
 Scaphytopius thea Linnavuori & DeLong 1979 c g
 Scaphytopius torridus Ball 1916 c g
 Scaphytopius transversalis Linnavuori 1959 c g
 Scaphytopius triangularis DeLong, 1945 c g b
 Scaphytopius trilineatus Ball 1916 c g
 Scaphytopius tripunctatus DeLong 1943 c g
 Scaphytopius utahensis Hepner 1946 c g
 Scaphytopius verecundus Van Duzee, 1910 c g b
 Scaphytopius vermiculatus DeLong 1943 c g
 Scaphytopius vinculatus Linnavuori & DeLong 1978 c g
 Scaphytopius vinculus DeLong 1943 c g
 Scaphytopius virescens Zanol 2000 c g
 Scaphytopius viridicephalus Hepner 1946 c g
 Scaphytopius vittifrons Hepner 1946 c g

Data sources: i = ITIS, c = Catalogue of Life, g = GBIF, b = Bugguide.net

References

Scaphytopius